Nanshijiao (formerly transliterated as Nanshih Chiao Station until 2003) is a metro station in New Taipei, Taiwan served by the Taipei Metro. It is built on the site of the old Zhonghe Railway Station, which ceased operations in 1990.

Station overview

This four-level, underground station has an island platform and four exits. The area above ground is currently being developed into a new high-rise building.

The Taipei Metro Zhonghe Depot is located on the southeast side of the station.

Public Art
Art in this station has a theme of "Youth Melody" and cost NT$4,999,000. It includes numerous pieces of colorful public art created by local artist Jun Lai and was completed on 30 November 1998. Consisting of 12 sculptures (3 hung from the ceiling; 9 hung on the walls), they symbolize the passion of youth with a light, joyful tone.

Station layout

Exits
Exit 1: Nanshan Rd.
Exit 2: Helping St.
Exit 3: Jieyun Rd.
Exit 4: Xingnan Rd. Sec.1

Around the station
Xingnan Night Market

References

Railway stations opened in 1998
Zhonghe–Xinlu line stations
Zhonghe District